Radu-ye Polan (also Romanized as Rādū-ye Polān; also known as Rādū-ye Bālā) is a village in Polan Rural District, Polan District, Chabahar County, Sistan and Baluchestan Province, Iran. At the 2006 census, its population was 518, in 105 families.

References 

Populated places in Chabahar County